James Earl Weatherford (born August 16, 1946) is a former American football defensive back who played for the Atlanta Falcons of the National Football League (NFL). He played college football at University of Tennessee.

References 

1946 births
Living people
Sportspeople from Athens, Georgia
Players of American football from Georgia (U.S. state)
American football defensive backs
Tennessee Volunteers football players
Atlanta Falcons players